Night Sessions is the fourth studio album by trumpet player Chris Botti. This is his first album to be released by Columbia Records on October 2, 2001.

Track listing

Personnel 
 Chris Botti – trumpet (1, 2, 3, 5-12)
 Kipper – keyboards (1, 2, 3, 5-12), drum programming (6, 9)
 Billy Childs – additional keyboards (2, 5, 6, 9), keyboards (4)
 Jeff Lorber – additional keyboards (2, 3)
 Jeff Young – additional keyboards (2, 3, 5, 9, 10, 12)
 Dominic Miller – guitar (1, 2, 3, 5, 6, 7, 9, 10, 11)
 Shane Fontayne – guitar (2)
 Heitor Pereira – guitar (7)
 Marc Shulman – guitar (8)
 Jimmy Johnson – bass (1, 3, 8-11)
 Jon Ossman – bass (2)
 Christian McBride – bass (5, 7, 12)
 Abe Laboriel, Jr. – drums (1, 2, 7, 9, 12)
 Vinnie Colaiuta – drums (3, 5, 6, 8, 10, 11)
 Luis Conte – percussion (2, 5, 7, 9, 10, 12)
 Kazu Matsui – shakuhachi (1)
 Bill Reichenbach Jr. – trombone (3, 6)
 Shawn Colvin – vocals (5)
 Lani Groves – additional vocals (5)
 Camilla – vocals (8)

Production 
 Producer – Kipper
 Executive Producer – Bobby Colomby
 Engineers – Chris Botti, Kevin Killen, Kipper and Christopher J. Roberts.
 Additional Engineers – Rick Behrens, Jay Goin, Jimmy Hoyson, Matt Marrin, Jonathan Merritt, Fred Remmert and Ted Spencer.
 Recorded at Sony Music Studios (Los Angeles, CA); Cedar Creek Recording (Austin, TX); Ted Spencer Recording (New York City, NY).
 Mixing – Ed Cherney and Nathaniel Kunkel
 Mix Assistant on Tracks 2, 7 & 10 – Wesley Seidman
 Mixed at The Mix Room (Burbank, CA); The Village Recorder (Los Angeles, CA); Capitol Studios (Hollywood, CA); Record Plant (New York City, NY).
 Mastered by Ted Jensen at Sterling Sound (New York City, NY).
 Art Direction and Design – Mary Maurer 
 Silhouettes – Isabel Snyder
 Photography – Fabrizio Ferri

Charts

References

Chris Botti albums
2001 albums
Columbia Records albums
Instrumental albums
Albums produced by Kipper (musician)